Garth Roe (born 9 July 1973) is a South African cricketer. He played in 79 first-class and 100 List A matches between 1993 and 2005.

See also
 List of Eastern Province representative cricketers

References

External links
 

1973 births
Living people
South African cricketers
Eastern Province cricketers
Griqualand West cricketers
North West cricketers
Cricketers from Port Elizabeth